Pyramoides oblongicollis is a species of ground beetle in the family Carabidae, found in Brazil.

References

oblongicollis
Beetles described in 1863